Gabriele Lancieri (born 17 January 1975 in Imola) is an Italian racing driver. He has competed in such series as Euro/Italian Formula 3000, International GT Open, International Formula 3000 and the FIA GT Championship.

Complete Italian/Euro Formula 3000 results

(key) (Races in bold indicate pole position; races in italics indicate fastest lap)

Complete International Formula 3000 results

References

External links
 Official website 
 Career statistics from Driver Database

1975 births
Living people
Italian racing drivers
Porsche Supercup drivers
International GT Open drivers
24 Hours of Spa drivers

Aston Martin Racing drivers
International Formula 3000 drivers
FIA GT Championship drivers
Durango drivers
AF Corse drivers
24H Series drivers